Kenneth "Kenny" Marino (December 29, 1943 – September 27, 2010) was an American actor.

Career
Marino first appeared in the 1981 film Prince of the City as Dom Bando. He later appeared in 1984's Alphabet City. He also starred in Charles Bronson's Death Wish 3. Marino's final appearance was in an episode of the short-lived crime drama series ''The Black Donnellys as McGee.

Death
Marino died in Jersey City, New Jersey at the age of 66.

Filmography

References

External links

1943 births
2010 deaths
American male film actors
American people of Italian descent